The Chicago mayoral election of 1887 saw Republican John A. Roche win by a landslide, receiving more than a two-thirds majority of the vote, defeating Socialist Robert S. Nelson by more than 36 points (a margin of victory which was itself greater than Nelson's vote share).

Lack of Democratic nominee
The Democratic Party failed to field a candidate.

Incumbent Democrat Carter Harrison Sr. had opted to retire as mayor. Harrison had lost the backing of his party. This came amid declining public support for Harrison. Among other reasons, Harrison had lost the Party's backing were his handling of the Haymarket Riot and his failure to receive the endorsement of the United Labor Party (which he had attempted to convince to support him in the fusion ticket with the Democrats). His handling of the Haymarket affair also harmed his standing with business groups. Another factor in his decision to not seek reelection was election scandals relating to charges brought against individuals of election fraud which, while having little to do with Harrison's own personal conduct, were still prospectively damaging to his chances of victory.

The Democratic Party nominated DeWitt Clinton Cregier, who refused their nomination. After this, and despite his declared intent to retire, they attempted to nominate Harrison, who also refused their nomination.

Campaign
Roche ran as a fiscally conservative "law-and-order" candidate.

Roche was regarded by many Democrats to be the lesser of two evils. Behind-the-scenes, Roche received unlikely support from such Democrats as Michael Cassius McDonald. Incumbent Harrison, while not backing either candidate, dismissed many Democrats' worries about the prospect of a Nelson mayoralty, and also cautioned that a Roche election could spur the passage of additional blue laws.

Results
Roche received a roughly 27,000-vote margin-of-victory, at the time the greatest in the city's history.

References

Mayoral elections in Chicago
Chicago
Chicago
1880s in Illinois